Craig is a home rule municipality that is the county seat and the most populous municipality of Moffat County, Colorado, United States. The city population was 9,060 at the 2020 United States Census. Craig is the principal city of the Craig, CO Micropolitan Statistical Area.

History
Founded by William H. Tucker, Craig was incorporated as a city on July 15, 1908. The town was named for one of the town's financial backers, Reverend William Bayard Craig.

Craig became the county seat when Moffat County was created out of the western portion of Routt County on February 27, 1911. In the same area as Craig, at the confluence of the Yampa River (then known as the Bear River) and Fortification Creek, were previous towns known as Yampa (as early as 1885) and Windsor (as early as 1878). In 1878, the area consisted of a number of ranches and at least two businesses: Himley's Ferry (which allowed crossing of the Yampa River) and Peck's Store (a one-room trading post).

In the 1970s and early 1980s, the largest power generation plant in Colorado and several coal mines were constructed near Craig.

Geography
Craig is located at  (40.516896, -107.550389).

Climate
Under the Köppen climate classification, Craig has a humid continental climate (Dfb). Summer days are hot with cool nights and very high diurnal temperature variation, while winters are cold and snowy with lows near zero.

Demographics

As of the census of 2000, there were 9,189 people, 3,525 households, and 2,432 families residing in the city. The racial makeup of the city was 92.56% White, 0.30% African American, 0.96% Native American, 0.42% Asian, 0.02% Pacific Islander, 3.84% from other races, and 1.89% from two or more races. Hispanic or Latino of any race were 10.80% of the population.

There were 3,525 households, out of which 38.3% had children under the age of 18 living with them, 54.3% were married couples living together, 9.6% had a female householder with no husband present, and 31.0% were non-families. 25.9% of all households were made up of individuals, and 8.9% had someone living alone who was 65 years of age or older.  The average household size was 2.53 and the average family size was 3.05.

In the city, the population was spread out, with 28.5% under the age of 18, 9.6% from 18 to 24, 30.1% from 25 to 44, 21.9% from 45 to 64, and 9.9% who were 65 years of age or older.  The median age was 34 years. For every 100 females, there were 106.3 males.  For every 100 females age 18 and over, there were 103.4 males.

The median income for a household in the city was $41,091, and the median income for a family was $45,504. Males had a median income of $38,038 versus $21,806 for females. The per capita income for the city was $18,140.  About 6.9% of families and 8.6% of the population were below the poverty line, including 10.5% of those under age 18 and 6.5% of those age 65 or over.

Transportation
Craig was the terminus of the never-finished Denver and Salt Lake Railway. While the tracks still exist to Craig, the effort to finish this line was abandoned, and the tracks to Craig became a spur route.

U.S. 40 is the primary east–west highway serving Craig, while Colorado State Highway 13 runs south to Interstate 70 and north to Wyoming, where it becomes Wyoming State Highway 789, ending in the north at Interstate 80.

Craig-Moffat Airport serves as the local airfield. Scheduled passenger jet airline service is available at the Yampa Valley Airport located 15 miles east of Craig on U.S. 40.

Steamboat Transit Service (SST) provides three daily departures in the morning in summer and three in winter from Craig that travel through Hayden, Milner and Steamboat II before arriving in Steamboat Springs, CO.

Colorado's Bustang Service also provides transportation to the Front Range of Colorado.

Hunting
Craig is, according to the local chamber of commerce, "Elk Hunting Capital of the World".

Notable people
 Jennifer LeRoy (b. January 7, 1974) is an American model and actress. She was chosen as Playboy's Playmate of the Month in February 1993.
 Chance Phelps (July 14, 1984 – April 9, 2004) was a Lance Corporal in the United States Marine Corps who became known when Lt. Col. Michael Strobl escorted his remains from Iraq. Lt. Col. Strobl recorded his account of the escort in "Taking Chance", an article which was later made into a full-length movie by HBO under the same title.
 Dennis Preece (March 4, 1940 - April 25, 1997) was a Hall of Fame wrestling coach who attended the local high school in Craig, Colorado graduating in 1958.
 Angus Ellis Taylor (October 13, 1911 – April 6, 1999) was a Mathematician and Chancellor of UC Santa Cruz.
 Dick Winder (October 20, 1941 - December 8, 2014) was a college football coach who grew up in Craig and played for the Moffat County High School Bulldogs. 
 Edwin C. Johnson (January 1, 1884 – May 30, 1970) was an American politician of the Democratic Party who served as both governor of and U.S. senator from the state of Colorado.

See also

 List of municipalities in Colorado

References

External links

 
 CDOT map of the City of Craig
 W.B. Craig

Cities in Colorado
Cities in Moffat County, Colorado
County seats in Colorado